Charles Hardouin (1694 in Brittany, fl. Paris – 1718) was a French operatic baritone (basse taille).

Beginning his career as a cathedral singer, Hardouin was engaged by the Paris Opéra as a principal singer around 1693–1694, though from 1697 onwards he was eclipsed by the more powerful Gabriel-Vincent Thévenard. He was still singing in 1718 when he was acclaimed as Poliphème in Lully's Acis et Galatée.

Roles created
The grand priest in Destouches's Issé (Paris, 1697)
Mars in Desmarets' Vénus et Adonis (Paris, 1697)
Argante in André Campra's Tancrède (Paris, 1702)
Cadmus in Marin Marais's Sémélé (Paris, 1709)
Filindo/Héraclite in Campra's Les fêtes vénitiennes (Paris, 1710)
Eole/Arbas in Campra's Idoménée (Paris, 1712)

Sources
Weller, Philip (1992), 'Hardouin' in The New Grove Dictionary of Opera, ed. Stanley Sadie (London) 

French operatic baritones
Year of death unknown
Year of birth unknown
17th-century French male opera singers
18th-century French male opera singers